"Oro jaska, beana" is a song by Norwegian group The BlackSheeps. It won both the Norwegian MGP jr contest in September 2008 and went on to win MGP Nordic 2008, beating songs from Denmark, Sweden and Finland.

The song reached #1 in the official Norwegian charts.

Lyrics and topic
"Oro jaska, beana" is sung mainly in Norwegian, but has some phrases in Sami. The phrase Oro jaska is Sami for be quiet or shut up. The song is about a dog with health issues who later dies from excess blood pressure.

Awards
The track won The BlackSheeps a Spellemann award (Norwegian "Grammy") in the category "Årets låt" ("Song of the year") at Spellemannprisen 2008.

Notes and references

2008 songs
Norwegian songs
Norwegian-language songs
Sámi-language songs
Song articles with missing songwriters
Number-one singles in Norway
Songs about dogs
Songs about death